Aleksandr Pyshkin (born 13 April 1987) is a Russian handball player for St. Petersburg HC and the Russian national team.

References

1987 births
Living people
Russian male handball players
Sportspeople from Saint Petersburg